Adam Ditlev Wedell-Wedellsborg (1782-1827) was a Dano-Norwegian government official. He served as the County Governor of Lister og Mandal amt from 1810 until 1814. When he got the governorship he was only 28 years old. He was a baron and a member of the Wedel family, an old noble family from Germany. When the union between Denmark and Norway ended in 1814, he resigned as governor, left Norway and moved to Denmark. He died in the town of Assens in 1827, only 44 years old.

References

1782 births
1827 deaths
County governors of Norway
Wedel family